Joseph Moses Juran (December 24, 1904 – February 28, 2008) was a Romanian-born American engineer, management consultant and author. He was an advocate for quality and quality management and wrote several books on the topics. He was the brother of Academy Award winner Nathan Juran.

Early life
Juran was born in Brăila, Romania, one of six children born to Gitel and Jakob Juran; they later lived in Gura Humorului. His family was Jewish and as part of the Jewish community were subjected to oppression by the authorities and their gentile neighbors. To escape the antisemitism his father emigrated to the United States in 1909 with the rest of the family following in 1912 settling in Minneapolis, Minnesota.  In deciding to leave Romania the family avoided becoming victims of The Holocaust, as most of the Jews of Gura Humorului were detained and transported to Nazi concentration camps.  

Juran had three sisters and two brothers. Rebecca (Betty), Charlotte and Minerva, who earned a doctoral degree and had a career in education, film and art director Nathan Juran and Rudolph (Rudy) the founder of a municipal bond company. 

He attended Minneapolis South High School where he excelled, especially in mathematics. He graduated from high school in 1920. He was a chess champion at an early age, and later was dominant in chess at Western Electric. He graduated from the University of Minnesota with a bachelor's degree in electrical engineering.

In 1924, Juran joined Western Electric's Hawthorne Works where his first job was troubleshooting in the Complaint Department. In 1925, Bell Labs proposed that Hawthorne Works personnel be trained in its newly developed statistical sampling and control chart techniques. Juran was chosen to join the Inspection Statistical Department, a small group of engineers charged with applying and disseminating Bell Labs' statistical quality control innovations. This visible position in the company accelerated Juran's career.

Department chief
Juran was promoted to department chief in 1928, and the following year became a division chief. He published his first quality-related article in Mechanical Engineering in 1935. In 1937, he moved to Western Electric/AT&T's headquarters in New York City, where he held the position of Chief Industrial Engineer.

As a hedge against the uncertainties of the Great Depression, he enrolled in Loyola University Chicago School of Law in 1931. He graduated in 1935 and was admitted to the Illinois bar in 1936, though he never practiced law.

During the Second World War, through an arrangement with his employer, Juran served in the Lend-Lease Administration and Foreign Economic Administration. Just before the war's end, he resigned from Western Electric and his government post, intending to become a freelance consultant.

He soon joined the faculty of New York University as an adjunct professor in the Department of Industrial Engineering, where he taught courses in quality control and ran round table seminars for executives. He also worked via a small management consulting firm on projects for Gilette, Hamilton Watch Company and Borg-Warner. After the firm's owner's sudden death, Juran began his own independent practice, from which he made a comfortable living until his retirement in the late 1990s. His early clients included the now defunct Bigelow-Sanford Carpet Company, the Koppers Company, the International Latex Company, Bausch & Lomb and General Foods.

Japan
The end of World War II compelled Japan to change its focus from becoming a military power to becoming an economic one. Despite Japan's ability to compete on price, its consumer goods manufacturers suffered from a long-established reputation of poor quality. The first edition of Juran's Quality Control Handbook in 1951 attracted the attention of the Japanese Union of Scientists and Engineers (JUSE), which invited him to Japan in 1952. When he finally arrived in Japan in 1954, Juran met with executives from ten manufacturing companies, notably Showa Denko, Nippon Kōgaku, Noritake, and Takeda Pharmaceutical Company. He also lectured at Hakone, Waseda University, Ōsaka, and Kōyasan. During his life, he made ten visits to Japan, the last in 1990.

Working independently of W. Edwards Deming (who focused on the use of statistical process control), Juran—who focused on managing for quality—went to Japan and started courses (1954) in quality management. The training began with top and middle management. The idea that top and middle management needed training had found resistance in the United States. For Japan, it would take some 20 years for the training to pay off. In the 1970s, Japanese products began to be seen as the leaders in quality. This sparked a crisis in the United States due to quality issues in the 1980s.

Contributions

Pareto principle
In 1941, Juran came across the work of Vilfredo Pareto and began to apply the Pareto principle to quality issues (for example, 80% of a problem is caused by 20% of the causes). This is also known as "the vital few and the trivial many." In later years, Juran preferred "the vital few and the useful many" to signal that the remaining 80% of the causes should not be totally ignored.

Management theory
When he began his career in the 1920s, the principal focus in quality management was on the quality of the end, or finished, product. The tools used were from the Bell system of acceptance sampling, inspection plans, and control charts. The ideas of Frederick Winslow Taylor dominated.

Juran is widely credited for adding the human dimension to quality management. He pushed for the education and training of managers. For Juran, human relations problems were the ones to isolate, and resistance to change was the root cause of quality issues. Juran credits Margaret Mead's book Cultural Patterns and Technical Change for illuminating the core problem in reforming business quality. His book Managerial Breakthrough, published in 1964, outlined the issue.

Juran's concept of quality management extended outside the walls of the factory to encompass nonmanufacturing processes, especially those that might be thought of as service related. For example, in an interview published in 1997 he observed:

The Juran trilogy
Juran was one of the first to write about the cost of poor quality. This was illustrated by his "Juran trilogy," an approach to cross-functional management, which is composed of three managerial processes: quality planning, quality control, and quality improvement. Without change, there will be a constant waste; during change there will be increased costs, but after the improvement, margins will be higher and the increased costs are recouped.

Transferring quality knowledge between East and West
During his 1966 visit to Japan, Juran learned about the Japanese concept of quality circles, which he enthusiastically evangelized in the West. He also acted as a matchmaker between U.S. and Japanese companies looking for introductions to each other.

Juran Institute

Juran founded the Juran Institute in 1979. The Institute is an international training, certification, and consulting company that provides training and consulting services in quality management, Lean Six Sigma management and business process management, as well as Six Sigma certification. The institute is based in Tysons Corner, Virginia. Their mission statement is to "Create a global community of practice to empower organizations and people to push beyond their limits."

Retirement
Juran was active into his 80s, and gave up international travel only at age 86. He retired at age 90 but still gave interviews. His activities during the second half of his life include:
Consulting for U.S. companies such as Armour and Company, Dennison Manufacturing Company, Merck, Sharp & Dohme, Otis Elevator Company, Xerox, and the United States Navy Fleet Ballistic Missile System., Steve Jobs.
Consulting for Western European and Japanese companies such as Rolls-Royce Motors, Philips, Volkswagen, Royal Dutch Shell, and Toyota Motor Company.
Pro bono consulting for Soviet-bloc countries (Hungary, Romania, Czechoslovakia, Russia, Poland, and Yugoslavia).
Founding the Juran Institute and the Juran Foundation.

Personal life
In 1924, Juran met Sadie Shapiro when his sister Betty moved to Chicago, and Sadie and he met Betty's train at the station. Juran wrote of meeting Sadie in his autobiography saying, "There and then I was smitten and have remained so ever since." In 1925, on Juran's 21st birthday, the couple became engaged, and 15 months later in 1926 they were married. They were married for 81 years.

Together he and Sadie had four children, a daughter and three sons, Robert, Sylvia, Charles, and Donald. Sylvia had a doctorate in Russian literature and Robert was an award-winning newspaper editor.

At the age of 92 Juran began writing his autobiography which was published two months before his 99th birthday. 

In 2004, aged 100, he was awarded an honorary doctorate from Luleå University of Technology, Sweden. A special event was held in May to mark his 100th birthday.

On 28 February 2008, aged 103, Juran died of a stroke, in Rye, New York. He remained active until his death caring for himself and Sadie, who was in poor health. Sadie died on 2 December 2008, at age 103. The couple were survived by their four children, ten grandchildren, and ten great-grandchildren. 

Juran left a book that was 37% complete, which he began at age 98.

See also
Quality by Design

Bibliography
Juran cites the following as his most influential works:

Books

Eventually published in seven editions: 2nd edition, 1962, 3rd edition, 1974, 4th edition, 1988, 5th edition, 1999, 6th edition, 2010 7th edition, 2017

 Architect of Quality: The Autobiography of Dr. Joseph M. Juran” ISBN 0-07-142610-8

Published papers

In Japanese

a collection of Juran's 1954 lectures
Lectures in Quality Control, 1956
Lectures in General Management, 1960

References

External links

 The Juran Institute's official web site
ASQ Juran page

1904 births
2008 deaths
Romanian Jews
American business theorists
American centenarians
Men centenarians
American industrial engineers
American people of Romanian-Jewish descent
American statisticians
Loyola University Chicago School of Law alumni
National Medal of Technology recipients
New York University faculty
People from Brăila
Businesspeople from Minneapolis
People from Ridgefield, Connecticut
Quality experts
Romanian emigrants to the United States
Romanian statisticians
University of Minnesota College of Science and Engineering alumni
Engineers from Connecticut
20th-century American businesspeople
South High School (Minnesota) alumni